Xim is a monotypic genus of North American sheet weavers containing the single species, Xim trenzado. It was first described by G. Ibarra-Núñez, D. Chamé-Vázquez and J. Maya-Morales in 2021, and it has only been found in Mexico.

See also
 List of Linyphiidae species (Q–Z)

References

Monotypic Linyphiidae genera
Spiders of Mexico